Autoworld is a museum of vintage cars in Brussels, Belgium. It is located in the South Hall of the Parc du Cinquantenaire/Jubelpark, and displays a large and varied collection of over 250 European and American automobiles from the late 19th century to the 1990s. It is notable for its collections of early and Belgian-produced vehicles, including Minervas and several limousines belonging to the Belgian Royal Family.

History
The core of the museum was formed by the collections of two collectors: Charly De Pauw and Ghislain Mahy. Mahy bought his first car, a Ford T, in 1944. This turned out to be the start of a collection that grew into about a thousand vehicles, amongst which many Belgian brands such as Minervas, Germain, FN, Imperia, Fondu, Vivinus, Nagant, Belga-Rise and Miesse.

For half a century, the collection took shape in the former Wintercircus in Ghent. In 1986, a selection of 230 cars was transferred to Brussels, where they are housed in the South Hall of the Cinquantenaire complex, also called Palais Mondial. The remaining 750 cars are located in Mahymobiles, an automobile museum located in Leuze-en-Hainaut, Belgium.

Collections
The museum exhibits cars from the end of the 19th century up to the 1990s. These include Minervas, a 1928 Bentley, a 1930 Bugatti and a 1930 Cord, and several limousines belonging to the Belgian Royal Family. In addition to passenger cars, motorcycles, sports cars, fire engines and carriages from the 19th century are also on display.

Events
Vehicle orientated events, such as anniversary celebrations of different car marques and automotive industry events such the AutoSens conference.

Gallery

See also
 Art & History Museum
 History of Brussels
 Culture of Belgium
 Belgium in "the long nineteenth century"

References

Notes

External links

 

Museums in Brussels
Automotive museums
Cinquantenaire